Margaret River Airport  is located in Bramley near Margaret River, Western Australia. It was established in 1981 and sealed in 1999. 

The airport is used by the Royal Flying Doctor Service and private charter flights. Largely government-subsidised flights from Perth to this airport via Busselton, which were operated by Maroomba Airlines and Skippers Aviation, ran from 1999 to 2001.

Access is via Bussell Highway and Perimeter Road via Airport Access Road.

See also
 List of airports in Western Australia
 Aviation transport in Australia

References

External links
 Airservices Aerodromes & Procedure Charts

Airports in Western Australia
Airports established in 1981
1981 establishments in Australia